Used to Be may refer to:

 Used to Be, a 1982 album by Charlene
 "Used to Be", a 1982 song by Charlene and Stevie Wonder 
 "Used to Be", a 2018 song by AJ Mitchell
 "Used to Be" (Beach House song), a 2008 song by Beach House
 "Used to Be", a 2019 song by the Jonas Brothers from the album, Happiness Begins
 "Used to Be", a 2020 song by Best Coast from the album, Always Tomorrow

See also
 Use ta Be My Girl